René Maillard (18 January 1923 – 25 April 2005) was a Swiss footballer who played as an attacking midfielder. He made 14 appearances for the Switzerland national team from 1946 to 1951. He was also named in Switzerland's squad for the Group 4 qualification tournament for the 1950 FIFA World Cup.

References

External links
 

1923 births
2005 deaths
People from Lavaux-Oron District
Swiss men's footballers
Association football midfielders
Switzerland international footballers
Swiss Super League players
FC Lausanne-Sport players
Sportspeople from the canton of Vaud